Developmental toxicity is any structural or functional alteration, reversible or irreversible, which interferes with homeostasis, normal growth, differentiation, development or behavior. Developmental toxicity is caused by environmental insult, which includes drugs, alcohol, diet, toxic chemicals, and physical factors. More factors causing developmental toxicity are radiation, infections (e.g. rubella), maternal metabolic imbalances (e.g. alcoholism, diabetes, folic acid deficiency), drugs (e.g. anticancer drugs, tetracyclines, many hormones, thalidomide), and environmental chemicals (e.g. mercury, lead, dioxins, PBDEs, HBCD, tobacco smoke).In addition, it is the study of adverse effects on the development of the organism that can result from exposure to toxic agents before conception, during fetal development, or even following birth. 
Certain pathogens are also included since the toxins they secrete are known to cause adverse effects on the development of the organism when the mother or fetus is infected. The term  developmental toxicity has widely replaced the early term for the study of primarily structural congenital abnormalities, teratology, to enable inclusion of a more diverse spectrum of congenital disorders. The substance that causes developmental toxicity from embryonic stage to birth is called teratogens. The effect of the developmental toxicants depends on the type of substance, dose, duration, and time of the exposure. The first few weeks of embryogenesis in humans is more susceptible to these agents. 

The embryogenesis is the most crucial time for the action of any teratogenic substances to result in birth defects. Once fertilization has taken place, the toxicants in the environment can pass through the mother to the developing embryo or fetus across the placental barrier. The fetus is at greatest risk during the first 14th to 60th day of the pregnancy when the major organs are being formed. However, depending on the type of toxicant and amount of exposure, a fetus can be exposed to toxicants at any time during pregnancy, but have different effects. For example, exposure to a particular toxicant at one time in the pregnancy may result in organ damage and at another time in the pregnancy could cause death of the fetus and miscarriage. There are a number of chemicals, biological agents (such as bacteria and viruses), and physical agents (such as radiation) used in a variety of workplaces that are known to cause developmental disorders. Developmental disorders can include a wide range of physical abnormalities, such as bone or organ deformities, or behavioral and learning problems, such as an intellectual disability. Exposures to some chemicals during pregnancy can lead to the development of cancer later in life, called transgenerational carcinogens. Exposure to toxicants during the second and third trimesters of a pregnancy can lead to slow fetal growth and result in low birth weight.

History 
Researchers have been able to ascertain toxicity associated with abnormal development with new breakthrough in developmental biology. This type of specific research is called Developmental and Reproductive Toxicology (DART). Recognition of the developmental toxic effects of various molecules is recent development.

Terato means monster in Greek. Until the 18th century, the preformism theory was accepted by which abnormal growth was considered as deformations. The 19th century saw developmental in descriptive embryology where abnormalities were now considered as malformations or errors during a developmental process giving rise to the concept of teratogenesis. By the 20th century, the concept of epigenesis the interaction between a genetic program and environment was established and in the second half of the 20th century researchers had evidence that environmental factors can cause malformations and even trans-generational effects.

Toxicity effects 
Developmental toxicity is the alterations of the developmental processes (organogenesis, morphogenesis) rather than functional alterations of already developed organs. The effects of the toxicants depends on the dose, threshold and duration. The effects of toxicity are:
 Minor structural deformities - e.g. Anticonvulsant drugs, Warfarin, Retinoic Acid derivatives
 Major structural deformities - e.g. DES (diethylstilbestrol), cigarette smoking
 Growth Retardation - e.g. Alcohol, Polychlorinated Biphenyls
 Functional alterations - e.g. Retinoic Acid derivatives, Polychlorinated Biphenyls, Phenobarbitol, Lead
 Death- e.g. Rubella, ACE inhibitors

Testing and risk assessment 
Testing for developmental toxicant is done in different stages:
 Fertilization to implantation - Fertilization followed by increase in cell number, cleavage and cavitation to form the blastocyst which gets implanted. Toxicant exposure at this stage usually prevents implantation and results in death. e.g. DDT, nicotine
 Implantation to gastrulation - The three germ layers are formed and the cells start migrating out to initiate organogenesis. This is most sensitive stage for alcohol toxicity.
 Organogenesis - It is the formation of limbs, organs, nervous system, urinary and genital systems by the process of cell differentiation, migration and cell interactions from the 3rd to 8th week of human gestation. e.g. DES
 Morphogenesis - Includes the stages of growth and physiological maturation from week 8 until birth. Teratogenic effects results in deformations and rather than malformations in the fetus.
 Post Natal to puberty - Environmental toxicant exposures.
Because of the complexity of the embryo-fetal development, including the maternal-fetal interactions during gestation, it is important to understand the mechanism of toxicity and test the toxic effect in more than two species before confirming the substance to be a developmental toxicant. Embryo have different critical periods for the organ formation from day 15 to day 60 and hence the susceptibility to toxicant injury is directly related to the period of development.

Maternal irradiation and congenital malformations 
One of the first environmentally induced congenital malformations in humans were recognized as a result of maternal irradiation. Hiroshima (1953) and Nagasaki (1955) had ascertained this fact for the first time based on the records of births occurring before May 31, 1946, but after the atomic bombing (August 6, 1945, in Hiroshima; August 9, 1945, in Nagasaki). A 20% increase in microcephaly frequency was seen in children with in-utero radiation exposure during the first trimester of the pregnancy (Miller 1956, 1968). Sensitivity to these radiations was seen to be predominantly high during the 7–15th week of gestation.

Two pertinent points were observed during this study:
 The severity and frequency of the congenital abnormalities seen increased with dose of radiation which depended on the closeness to the source or explosion.
 It was determined that there were critical periods of pregnancy when these exposures had the maximum effect on the fetal development.

Congenital rubella syndrome (CRS) 

Rubella was the first recognized human epidemic of malformations. Following a widespread epidemic of rubella infection in 1940, Norman Gregg, an Australian ophthalmologist, reported in 1941 the occurrence of congenital cataracts among 78 infants born following maternal rubella infection in early pregnancy. This indicated that the virus had to cross the placental barrier to reach the fetus and cause malformations. The time of exposure to the virus also had a direct impact on the incidence of congenital malformations with exposure during week 4, 5–8 and 9–12 weeks of pregnancy caused 61%, 26% and 8% of congenital malformations. This was the first published recognition of congenital rubella syndrome (CRS). The progeny had congenital eye, heart and ear defects as well as intellectual disability.

Thalidomide Tragedy (1950) 

Thalidomide was extensively used for the treatment of nausea in pregnant women in the late 1950s and early 1960s until it became apparent in the 1960s that it resulted in severe birth defects. Fetus that were exposed to thalidomide while in the womb experienced limb malformation by which the limb were not developed or appeared as stumps. Other effects also seen with thalidomide exposure included deformed eyes and hearts, deformed alimentary and urinary tracts, blindness and deafness. The thalidomide tragedy marked a turning point in toxicity testing, as it prompted United States and international regulatory agencies to develop systematic toxicity testing protocol. The effects of thalidomide led to important discoveries in the biochemical pathways of limb development.

Effects on neurulation 
Neurulation is one of the most important stages in the development of vertebrates. It is the process of formation of a flat neural plate which then convolutes to form the hollow neural tube. It is considered to be one of the main targets of developmental toxicity and defects in neurulation is a common consequence of toxicant exposure and results in large proportion of human defects. Neurulation exposure to developmental toxicity is caused by the increased rate of cell proliferation and the ventral to dorsal migration of neuroepithelial cells. Epigenetic factors disrupt the normal process of the formation of the neural tube causing Neural Tube Defects (NTD). This leads to spina bifida, a common human defect.

Fetal alcohol syndrome (FAS) 

Fetal alcohol spectrum disorders (FASD) is a term that constitutes the set of conditions that can occur in a person whose mother drank alcohol during the course of pregnancy. These effects can include physical and cognitive problems. FASD patient usually has a combination of these problems. Extent of effect depends on exposure frequency, dose and rate of ethanol elimination from amniotic fluid. FAS disrupts normal development of the fetus, which may cause certain developmental stages to be delayed, skipped, or immaturely developed. Since alcohol elimination is slow in a fetus than in an adult and the fact that they do not have a developed liver to metabolize the alcohol, alcohol levels tend to remain high and stay in the fetus longer. Birth defects associated with prenatal exposure to alcohol can occur in the first three to eight weeks of pregnancy before a woman even knows that she is pregnant.

DES (diethylstilbestrol) 

DES (diethylstilbestrol) is a drug that mimics estrogen, a female hormone. From 1938 until 1971, doctors prescribed this drug to help some pregnant women who had had miscarriages or premature deliveries on the theory that miscarriages and premature births occurred because some pregnant women did not produce enough estrogen naturally to sustain the pregnancy for full term. An estimated 5–10 million pregnant women and the children born during this period were exposed to DES. Currently, DES is known to increase the risk of breast cancer, and cause a variety of birth-related adverse outcomes exposed female offsprings such as spontaneous abortion, second-trimester pregnancy loss, preterm delivery, stillbirth, neonatal death, sub/infertility and cancer of reproductive tissues. DES is an important developmental toxicant which links the fetal basis of adult disease.

Methylmercury 

Methylmercury and inorganic mercury is excreted in human breast milk and infants are particularly susceptible to toxicity due to this compound. The fetus and infant are especially vulnerable to mercury exposures with special interest in the development of the CNS since it can easily cross across the placental barrier, accumulate within the placenta and fetus as the fetus cannot eliminate mercury and have a negative effect on the fetus even if the mother does not show symptoms. Mercury causes damage to the nervous system resulting from prenatal or early postnatal exposure and is very likely to be permanent.

Chlorpyrifos 

It is an organophosphate insecticide that acts on the nervous system of insects by inhibiting acetylcholinesterase but are moderately toxic to humans. But it is known have developmental effects appear in fetuses and children even at very small doses.

Environmental endocrine disruptors 
Endocrine disruptors are molecules that alter the structure or function of the endocrine system like DDT, BPA etc. Prenatal BPA exposure is associated with aggression and neurobehaviour changes. Endocrine disruptors may have different effects depending on the extent of the exposure.

Epigenetics 

Most toxicants are known to affect only a fraction of exposed population. This is due to the differences in the genetic makeup of the organisms which affects toxicant metabolism and clearance from the body. Effect of developmental toxicants depends on the genetic makeup of the mother and fetus.

Major developmental toxicants 
Some of the known developmental toxicants can be grouped under the following categories:

Reproductive toxins:
 Aminopterin
 Methotrexate
 Androgen
 ACE inhibitor
 Antituberculous drug
 Caffeine
 Cocaine
 Coumarin
 Diethylstilbestrol
 Ethanol
 Insulin shock therapy
 Isotretinoin
 Streptomycin
 Thalidomide
 Trimethoprim
 Vitamin A
 Vitamin D
 Warfarin
Anti-convulsants:
 Diphenylhydantoin
 Trimethadione
 Paramethadione
 Valproic Acid
 Carbamazepine
Chemicals:
 Lead
 Gasoline
 Methylmercury
 Polychlorinated biphenyl
 Toluene toxicity
Biological agents:
 Cytomegalovirus
 Rubella
 Herpes simplex virus
 HIV
 Syphilis
 Toxoplasmosis
 Varicella zoster virus
 Venezuelan equine encephalitis virus
Lifestyle:
 Tobacco smoking
 Alcoholism
Maternal metabolic imbalances:
 Cretinism
 Diabetes mellitus
 Folic acid deficiency
 Hyperthermia
 Phenylketonuria
 Rheumatic disorder

References

Sources
 

Toxicology
Teratogens